The University of Massachusetts Boston (stylized as UMass Boston) is a public research university in Boston, Massachusetts. It is the only public research university in Boston and the third-largest campus in the five-campus University of Massachusetts system. UMass Boston is the third most diverse university in the United States. While a majority of UMass Boston students are Massachusetts residents, international students and students from other states make up a significant portion of the student body. Founded with a distinct urban mission, UMass Boston has a long history of serving the city of Boston, including numerous partnerships with local community organizations
. It is an official member institution of the Coalition of Urban Serving Universities and the Coalition of Urban and Metropolitan Universities. It is classified among "R2: Doctoral Universities – High research activity".

History

Origins (Pre-1964) 

The University of Massachusetts System dates back to the founding of Massachusetts Agricultural College under the Morrill Land-Grant Acts in 1863. However, prior to the founding of UMass Boston, the Amherst campus was the only public, comprehensive university in the state. Even as late as the 1950s, Massachusetts ranked at or near the bottom in public funding per capita for higher education, and proposals to expand the University of Massachusetts into Boston was opposed both by faculty and administrators at the Amherst campus and by the private colleges and universities in Boston. In 1962, the 162nd Massachusetts General Court expanded the UMass System for the first time to Worcester, Massachusetts with the creation of the University of Massachusetts Medical School. In 1963, UMass President John W. Lederle informed the General Court that more than 1,200 graduates of Boston area high schools qualified to attend the University of Massachusetts were denied admission to the Amherst campus due to lack of space, and despite opposition from the Amherst campus, endorsed expanding the UMass System with a commuter campus in Boston. At the time, there were 12,000 freshman applications to the University of Massachusetts in Amherst with only 2,600 slots, yet the majority of the applicants lived in the Greater Boston area.

In 1964, Massachusetts Senate Majority Leader Maurice A. Donahue and State Senator George V. Kenneally Jr. introduced a bill to establish a Boston campus for the UMass System, with Majority Whip of the Massachusetts House of Representatives Robert H. Quinn co-sponsoring the House bill, and the Massachusetts AFL–CIO endorsing the legislation. The bill was opposed by several private colleges and universities in the Boston area, including Northeastern University, Boston University, and Boston College (who argued that the state would be better off subsidizing the existing private institutions in the city), as well as by Boston State College, the only public institution of higher education in the city (who argued for expanding its campus on Huntington Avenue instead). However, the Huntington Avenue building of Boston State College could not be expanded to accommodate a 15,000-student campus, and the local news media and public opinion generally favored creating the new Boston campus for the UMass System.

1964–1974: Park Square campus 

On June 16, 1964, with a $200,000 appropriation, the legislation establishing the University of Massachusetts Boston was passed by the 163rd Massachusetts General Court and was signed into law two days later by Massachusetts Governor Endicott Peabody. UMass President John W. Lederle began recruiting freshmen students, faculty, and administrative staff for the fall semester of 1965 (with goals of 1,000 students and 80 faculty members), and appointed his assistant at the Amherst campus, John W. Ryan, as UMass Boston's first chancellor. Ryan recruited tenured faculty members from the Amherst campus to relocate and form the UMass Boston faculty, and appointed Amherst's history professor Paul A. Gagnon and Amherst's provost and biology professor Arthur Gentile to hire the humanities and natural science faculty members respectively. One faculty member that made the move was historian Robert M. Berdahl (who later became chancellor of the University of California, Berkeley, President of the University of Texas at Austin, and president of the Association of American Universities).

Gagnon, with the assistance of Harvard University sociologist David Riesman, also recruited junior faculty members through recommendations of graduate students by the department chairs of Ivy League and other prestigious private universities in the Boston area. Serving as the new university's first provost, Gagnon became the most important faculty member in defining the curriculum and academic focus of the university, saying in June 1965 that "The first aim of the University of Massachusetts at Boston must be to build a university in the ancient tradition of Western civilization ... Along with creating a university in the great Western tradition, we must make it public and urban in all that these words imply in 1965."

Gagnon would be the principal architect of the university's attempt to create a Great Books program called the "Coordinated Freshman Year English-History Program", which prompted criticism and opposition from younger faculty members in the English and History Departments (who wanted their students to have reading assignments that contained "more politically 'relevant' content"), from faculty in the social and natural sciences (who felt their fields were being neglected), and students (many of whom were Vietnam War veterans or working-class single parents working one or two jobs to pay for school), and that eventually led to its requirements being diluted and the program ultimately dismantled by the end of the 1960s.

Freshman classes started for 1,240 undergraduate students in September 1965 at a renovated building located at 100 Arlington Street in the Park Square area of Downtown Boston, formerly the headquarters of the Boston Gas Company (which had leased the building to the university). Virtually the entire entering class were residents of Massachusetts, with the great majority living in the Greater Boston area and one-fourth living in the city of Boston itself. By the fall of 1968, the number of applications to UMass Boston for the fall semester had risen from 2,500 for fall 1965 to 5,700, and total enrollment had risen to 3,600. In the late 1960s, UMass Boston students on average were 23 years old, typically white and male, working part- or full-time, and either married or living with others in an apartment. UMass Boston also reportedly had the largest population of Vietnam War veterans than any university in the United States (many of whom had been recently discharged), and the largest population of African American students of all universities in Massachusetts.

In February 1966, the 164th Massachusetts General Court appropriated funds for the university to purchase the building at 100 Arlington Street. Over the next three years, the university also leased the Sawyer Building on Stuart Street, the Salada Buildings on Columbus Avenue, a part of the Boston Statler Hotel for faculty and departmental office space, and the Armory of the First Corps of Cadets (which was converted into the university's library), while the university administration also had an arrangement with the Copley Square YMCA to provide students access to exercise equipment. Also in 1966, during the university's first Spring Weekend, the American folk music duo Simon & Garfunkel was the headline act. The student newspaper, The Mass Media, published its inaugural issue on November 16, 1966, and the Founding Day Convocation for the university was held December 10, 1966, at the Prudential Center in Boston. In 1968, a group of students started the folk music radio station WUMB-FM.

In the summer of 1968, inaugural Chancellor John W. Ryan resigned to return to his alma mater, Indiana University, in an administrative position, and was succeeded in October of that year by historian Francis L. Broderick (who was serving as a dean at Lawrence University at the time). Broderick oversaw the reorganization of the university into separate colleges (College I and College II), along with the establishment of the College of Public and Community Service, and presided over the university's first graduation ceremony on June 12, 1969 (where 500 of the original 1,240 students received diplomas). However, in addition to the university's budgetary problems, Broderick's tenure was consumed by the controversies of the times.

By early 1967, some younger professors were holding teach-ins and encouraging their male students to burn their draft cards in protest of "American corporate imperialism." The Young Socialist Alliance and the Students for a Democratic Society both had chapters on campus, and in April 1969, the latter group rallied more than a hundred students protesting the decision to move the university campus to Columbia Point. The following month, a student group called the "Afro-American Society", staged an occupation of summer school registration, demanding the immediate hiring of more black faculty members and the admission of more black students to the university.

From March 5 to March 20 in 1970, a group of thirty students occupied the chancellor's office after a popular "radical" female professor in the Sociology Department was denied tenure, and denounced the university as "corrupt, racist, sexist and servile to an exploitative class of capitalist oppressors." Following President Richard Nixon's announcement of the Vietnam War's Cambodian campaign on April 30, 1970, and the subsequent shooting of anti-war protestors at Kent State University on May 4, like hundreds of other universities across the United States, UMass Boston administration suspended regular business operations while the campus became consumed by protests (mostly organized by the campus chapter of the Vietnam Veterans Against the War).

However, no controversy was more contentious than the conflict over where UMass Boston would locate its campus permanently. The conflict emerged in 1965, not long after the university was initially founded: UMass President John W. Lederle had insisted upon a campus inside the city limits of Boston, while Boston Mayor John F. Collins publicly asked Chancellor John W. Ryan not to consider a permanent site in Downtown Boston, as a disproportionate amount of the valuable real estate there was already owned by many colleges and other non-profit institutions exempt from the city government's property taxes. In 1954, only one new private office building had appeared on the city skyline since 1929, one in five of the city's housing units were classified as dilapidated or deteriorating and the city was ranked lowest among major cities in building starts, while the only growing industries in the city were government and universities (leading to a narrowing tax base) and the city already had a higher number of municipal employees per capita than any major city in the United States.

In addition to Mayor Collins, the Boston business community, the Massachusetts General Court, WBZ radio, the editorial board of The Boston Globe, and residents of the South End were also opposed to a permanent downtown campus. Nonetheless, when the university purchased the building at 100 Arlington Street in 1966, many faculty and students interpreted the transaction as a signal that the university intended to settle permanently in Park Square. A proposal popular among students and faculty to build a high-rise academic building overlooking the Massachusetts Turnpike in Copley Square was cancelled when the John Hancock Insurance Company purchased the land and built John Hancock Tower there instead. Another proposal for a campus in the Highland Park area of Roxbury also met with opposition from residents. Other proposals to locate the permanent campus near Fenway Park, or South Station and Chinatown, or on golf courses for sale in Newton, were considered but rejected by Chancellor Ryan due to insufficient space or commuting concerns.

In 1967, the Boston Redevelopment Authority (BRA) published a study, titled An Urban Campus by the Sea, which proposed building the campus on the Columbia Point peninsula. The site was a former landfill, adjacent to the largest and poorest public housing complex in New England, and a mile from the MBTA's Columbia station. The proposal was deeply unpopular among the faculty and students; 1,500 of them subsequently organized a rally in November 1967 on Boston Common demanding a downtown location in Copley Square. In April 1969, when the Students for a Democratic Society organized its opposition rally, the student leaders denounced the university as "a 'pawn' masking the Boston Redevelopment Authority's plan to remove poor people from Columbia Point" and that "the university is planning a prestigious dormitory school with high tuition which students from low- and moderate-income families–whom the university was designed to serve–will not be able to attend."

In November 1965, the Environmental Pollution Panel of the Science Advisory Committee to President Lyndon B. Johnson released its final report that included the findings of a sub-panel studying atmospheric carbon dioxide composed of oceanographers Roger Revelle and Charles D. Keeling, geochemists Wallace S. Broecker and Harmon Craig, and meteorologist Joseph Smagorinsky demonstrating that the amount of carbon dioxide produced by fossil fuel combustion as a percentage of atmospheric carbon dioxide increased by 10 percent from 1860 through 1950 with an average rate of increase of 3.2 percent per year, that from 1954 through 1962 the average rate of increase was 5 percent per year, and that carbon dioxide produced by fossil fuel combustion was the only source of carbon dioxide being added to the atmosphere. The report concluded that if fossil fuel combustion continued to rise at the rates during the previous century or the previous decade, the amount of emitted carbon dioxide as a percentage of atmospheric carbon dioxide by 2000 would be a 42 to 60 percent increase from 1950 levels and that two possible consequences of the increase could be the melting of the Antarctic ice cap and rising sea levels.

Chancellor Ryan also opposed the Columbia Point proposal, who before he resigned in February 1968, made a counterproposal for a 15-acre campus south of where John Hancock Tower was being built that the BRA rejected. Architectural consultants of the university also scouted land near North Station and adjacent to the Boston Garden that was immediately opposed both by the ownership of the Boston Garden-Arena Corporation that owned the Boston Bruins (who threatened to move the team out of the city) and Boston Mayor Kevin White. In August 1968, after Francis L. Broderick was appointed the university's chancellor, now Speaker of the Massachusetts House of Representatives Robert H. Quinn, Massachusetts Senate Majority Leader Kevin B. Harrington, and State Senator George Kenneally all urged the UMass Board of Trustees to accept the Columbia Point proposal, while Chancellor Broderick asked the board to delay its decision at an October 1968 meeting by one month so that he might be able to deliver a final counterproposal (while another rally at the Massachusetts State House of 2,500 faculty and students still demanded a Copley Square or Park Square location).

In November 1968, Chancellor Broderick proposed a scattered-site campus of office buildings situated along the MBTA's Green Line in the South End that would be jointly owned by the university and businesses while retaining the original Arlington Street building. However, while the UMass Board of Trustees and UMass President John W. Lederle argued instead for a unified campus on Columbia Point, they allowed a task force an additional month to more fully study Broderick's proposal. In the end, after reviewing the task force's white paper at a meeting in December 1968, the UMass Board of Trustees voted 12 to 4 to accept the Columbia Point proposal.

The initial reactions of the residents of Savin Hill and Columbia Point were mixed. A coalition of 26 community organizations in Columbia Point and Dorchester formed the "Dorchester Tenants Action Council" (DTAC) to prevent an influx of students into the public housing project on Mount Vernon Street. When the Columbia Point public housing project opened in 1953, its initial demographics reflected that of the city's population: white tenants made up more than 90 percent of the population while black families made up approximately 7 percent. However, all reports at the time indicated that racial and ethnic tensions were minimal, that there were high levels of social trust within the neighborhood, and by 1955, had a long waiting list of families wanting to become new tenants. However, as race relations in the city of Boston deteriorated during the 1960s, many neighborhoods became more racially segregated due to redlining, and the Boston Housing Authority (BHA) segregated the public housing developments within the city as well, moving black families into the Columbia Point housing project and whites to other projects in South Boston (as many white families that had been on the waiting list for the complex by the early 1960s started refusing assignments to the Columbia Point project).

In 1972, Chancellor Francis L. Broderick resigned, and was succeeded by Italian literature professor Carlo L. Golino (who had been serving as vice president of academic affairs at the University of California, Riverside) in 1973. During Golino's tenure before the move to Columbia Point, the university began awarding its first master's degrees in English and mathematics. By the time the Columbia Point campus opened in 1974, only 75 percent of the units in the Columbia Point housing project were occupied, and the BHA now thought of the complex as "housing of last resort." However, as construction for the Columbia Point campus began, DTAC demanded the creation of a joint task force to address their housing concerns, while some within DTAC called for the university to construct dormitories as part of the Columbia Point proposal; legislation for doing so was proposed within the Massachusetts House of Representatives but failed to pass. In addition to DTAC, the Columbia Point Community Development Council also asked that a number of construction jobs be reserved for residents of the projects, including "set asides" for non-union minority workers that would later become a source of friction between the community groups and the university against the construction management firm, McKee-Berger-Mansueto (MBM) overseeing the project, its subcontractors, and the construction unions.

1974–1988: Columbia Point campus and Boston State College merger 

On January 28, 1974, the university opened its new campus on the Columbia Point peninsula surrounded by Dorchester Bay. Beginning in 1970, the construction of the Columbia Point campus was the largest public capital construction project in the history of Massachusetts (exceeded only later by the Big Dig). The state government hired a single construction management firm, McKee-Berger-Mansueto (MBM), to supervise six other architectural firms and construction companies to complete the project by September 1973. The construction had multiple delays: the Boston Edison Company had not finished its electrical work, and because the site was a former landfill (that had only been closed since 1963), a concrete and brick substructure (where all of the campus mechanical systems would run conduits) undergirded by hundreds of driven piles needed to be constructed before the buildings, but pile driving released methane from the former landfill, requiring construction workers to halt production while each release of methane dispersed.

The Columbia Point campus was originally composed of five buildings connected by a series of enclosed walkway footbridges (commonly called "catwalks") on the second floors of the buildings: McCormack Hall, Wheatley Hall, the Science Center, the Healey Library (which was designed by Chicago modernist architect Harry Weese), and the Quinn Administration Building. To transport students from Columbia station, the MBTA concluded that constructing a skyway from the station to the campus would be too expensive, and the university administration set about planning a shuttle bus system, funded by parking fees. Campus facilities would rise from the bottom of the substructure and the bottom of the substructure would provide entry to a parking garage with 1,600 spaces. Because the campus was surrounded on three sides by a bay, exposed to sea breeze and winter storms, the salt water in the atmosphere and the road salt carried from automobiles would eventually damage parts of the substructure beyond feasible repair.

Because the university was underneath flight paths arriving at Logan International Airport, all of the original Columbia Point campus buildings were soundproofed, and because of this, the classroom and offices in the buildings were designed as interior spaces with no windows, and the entrance to every building faced inward onto the campus plaza. Due to the campus being uniformly built of brick and the campus positioned above the landscape, the campus became known as "The Fortress", "The Rock", or "The Prison" colloquially. The buildings were rumored to have been designed by architects familiar with the architectural design of prisons (such as Weese, who designed the Chicago Metropolitan Correctional Center), but also designed so that the plaza could easily be occupied by the National Guard to suppress demonstrations and protests.

In 1974, the $350 million capital construction budget for erecting more buildings on the campus was frozen due to the 1973–1975 recession, halting any further expansion of the campus. In 1975, enabled by the move to Columbia Point, Chancellor Carlo L. Golino oversaw the opening of the College of Professional Studies (later renamed the College of Management), and in 1976, supervised the merger of College I and College II into a single College of Arts and Sciences. Golino would resign as chancellor in 1978, was succeeded in the interim by Claire Van Ummersen (the university's associate vice chancellor of academic affairs), and succeeded permanently in 1979 by Robert A. Corrigan, former arts and humanities provost at the University of Maryland. Construction for the Clark Athletic Center (that included an ice hockey arena, swimming pool, and basketball courts) broke ground in 1978 and was completed in 1979. On October 21, 1974, with the Boston busing desegregation underway, musician Stevie Wonder spoke and led students in song at a lounge in the university the day after he performed at the Boston Garden.

Also in 1975, the John F. Kennedy Presidential Library Corporation announced its decision to locate the John F. Kennedy Presidential Library and Museum on a 10-acre site offered by the university adjacent to its campus. In October 1963, President Kennedy had personally selected a site in Harvard Square near his alma mater, but after his assassination, Cambridge residents actively opposed the Kennedy family's efforts to build a presidential library there due to traffic concerns. Designed by architect I. M. Pei, construction for the building broke ground on June 12, 1977, and was completed and dedicated in October 1979. Two years later, the state government announced that it would construct a new building for the Massachusetts State Archives and Commonwealth Museum next to the campus and the JFK Library, and on December 2, 1982, the MBTA renamed Columbia station as JFK/UMass station.

In 1977, McKee-Berger-Mansueto, Inc. (MBM), the company contracted to supervise the construction of the campus, came under public scrutiny after its contract with the Commonwealth was criticized in a series of newspaper articles for being abnormally favorable towards MBM, and a special legislative committee (led by Amherst College President John William Ward) was formed to investigate the contract. A scandal erupted after it was learned MBM paid Massachusetts Senate Majority Leader Joseph DiCarlo and State Senator Ronald MacKenzie $40,000 in exchange for a favorable report from the committee. DiCarlo and MacKenzie were convicted of extortion. Newspaper columnist Charles Pierce summarized the careless and negligent quality of MBM's construction projects unearthed by the Ward Commission's investigation as follows:

Besides the Worcester jail with the cells that did not lock, there was the auditorium at Boston State College in which the stage was not visible from a third of the seats and the library at Salem State College in which the walls were not sturdy enough to bear the weight of the books. At the UMass-Boston campus, ground zero of the scandal, school officials were forced to erect barricades to keep passerby from being brained by the bricks that kept falling off the side of the library. Unsurprisingly, a completely corrupt system had produced completely shoddy buildings that the taxpayers, already fleeced once, would have to pay to repair.

In 1980, the 171st Massachusetts General Court voted to establish the Massachusetts Board of Regents of Higher Education with the authority to consolidate resources for public higher education in the state, and in 1981, the Board decided to merge UMass Boston and Boston State College by 1984. Such a merger (including the Massachusetts College of Art and Design as well) had been proposed in the state legislature in 1963 when UMass Boston was initially founded. Though the 1981 merger had allowed both schools a three-year grace period to ease the transition, a large cut in the state's higher education budget forced the Board of Regents to require a "shotgun wedding" merger to happen by September 1981 (although the Board did allow for it to be delayed until January of the following year). Boston State College had been in existence since 1852, and in the 130 years of its existence, mostly had a reputation as a teacher's college, situated in between the Boston Museum of Fine Arts and the Longwood Medical and Academic Area, with two of its other largest enrollments being in nursing and police administration. These programs would transfer over to UMass Boston fully intact, and would form the basis of the College of Education, the College of Nursing and Health Sciences, and the Criminal Justice program in the Sociology Department respectively.

In 1981, Boston State College enrolled roughly 6,000 students, and despite the Boston State College students having a similar demographic profile to UMass Boston students, many students expressed opposition to and disapproval of the merger. Many of Boston State College's undergraduate academic departments and programs that had equivalents at UMass Boston were disbanded, and as fewer of the Boston State faculty had PhDs than the UMass Boston faculty did, the Board of Regents also decided to terminate the employment of 98 full-time faculty members, 275 part-time teachers, and 15 of the 35 administrators at Boston State College. In the end, however, the merger boosted enrollment at UMass Boston by 38 percent in one year (from more than 8,000 in 60 areas of study in 1981 to more than 11,000 in 100 areas of study by 1983), and as Boston State College had more graduate programs than UMass Boston did at the time of the merger, most of Boston State College's graduate programs made the transition and tripled the graduate student enrollment at UMass Boston. By 1995, graduate students accounted for 21 percent of the university's total enrollment, and in 2011, the College of Nursing and Health Sciences was the ninth largest and was ranked as the 50th best undergraduate nursing program in the United States (and third best in New England) by U.S. News & World Report.

In 1986, construction began for the new Harbor Point Apartments complex to replace the original Columbia Point public housing project, and was completed in 1990. By the 1980s, only 300 families were living in the housing development, in part, because the Boston Housing Authority had allowed the buildings to deteriorate and be occupied by squatters, and the public housing project had drawn comparisons to the Pruitt–Igoe Apartments in St. Louis and the Cabrini–Green Homes in Chicago. As a consequence, the Boston city government leased the development on a 99-year contract to a private developer composed of a tenant-run community task force and the Corcoran-Mullins-Jennison Corporation that was supported by the university. The housing development is now billed as luxury apartments.

In 1988, Chancellor Robert A. Corrigan resigned. Besides the opening of the Clark Athletic Center and the Boston State College merger, during his tenure, he oversaw the authorization of the university's first PhD program (in environmental science), the university radio station WUMB-FM receive an FM broadcasting license in 1981 (along with its first air date on September 19, 1982), the opening of the John W. McCormack Institute of Public Affairs and the Urban Scholars program for talented Boston Public School students in 1983, as well as the opening of the William Monroe Trotter Institute for the Study of Black Culture in 1984. The women's track and field team won the university's first NCAA Division III championship in 1985, and a student-run café, the "Wit's End Café", opened in Wheatley Hall in 1987 and would last for two decades.

1988–2004: Penney and Gora Chancellorships 

In 1988, historian Sherry A. Penney succeeded Robert A. Corrigan as chancellor. Penney had been serving as chancellor of academic programs, policy, and planning for the State University of New York system. Her tenure was initially marred by an economic downturn in Massachusetts. During the en masse failure of more than 1,000 of the more than 3,200 savings and loan associations in the United States between 1986 and 1995, and following a pair of stock market crashes in 1987 and 1989 and an oil price shock in 1990, the U.S. economy went into recession from July 1990 until March 1991. The unemployment rate in Massachusetts had increased from 2.4 percent in 1988 to 9.7 percent in 1992, leading to falling state revenue. Massachusetts Governor Michael Dukakis responded by ordering all state agencies to cut their budgets in the 1989, 1990, and 1991 fiscal years (and sometimes multiple times during the same fiscal year), and return appropriations to the state treasury. Chancellor Penney oversaw the university return funds to the state government 11 times during the first four years of her tenure. In 1995, Dukakis would arrange for part of the remaining funds from his 1988 presidential campaign be used to support a public service student internship program at UMass Boston, and beginning in 2000, met with students in political science courses every year at the university along with former UMass System President and Massachusetts Senate President William Bulger.

In response to the budget cuts, Chancellor Penney began initiating major fundraising efforts (including a five-year capital campaign target of $50 million between 1995 and 2000, and a five-year master plan in 1999), and despite the decline in state support, implemented multiple research programs, PhD programs, and oversaw a reorganization of the school's colleges. In 1989, Chancellor Penney oversaw the opening of both the Urban Harbors Institute and The Mauricio Gastón Institute for Latino Community Development and Public Policy, and later oversaw the separation of the College of Arts and Sciences into the College of Science and Mathematics and the College of Liberal Arts. In 1990, the university launched PhD programs in clinical psychology, gerontology, and environmental biology. In 1993, the College of Public and Community Service established the Labor Resource Center and the College of Liberal Arts established the Institute for Asian American Studies, the College of Education began its partnership with The Mather School (the oldest public elementary school in the United States), and the Boston College Program for Women and Government moved to UMass Boston. Despite Chancellor Penney's efforts, many programs were consolidated or closed, such as the College of Education's undergraduate education degree.

In 1994, the Carnegie Commission on Higher Education classified UMass Boston as a Master's Comprehensive University I, poet Lloyd Schwartz won the 1994 Pulitzer Prize for Criticism, and in 1990 and 1998, art history professor Paul Hayes Tucker curated two exhibits at the Boston Museum of Fine Arts of paintings by Claude Monet. In 1997, Professor Tucker would also found the Arts on the Point sculpture park on the Harbor Campus, and the founder of the university radio station WUMB-FM also started the Boston Folk Festival. By 1998, the university had four main research areas that accounted for three-quarters of the university's research funding: Environmental Studies, Psycho-Social Functioning of At-Risk Populations, Education, and Health and Social Welfare. In 2000, the Carnegie Foundation for the Advancement of Teaching upgraded UMass Boston's designation to a Doctoral/Research University, Intensive, and UMass Boston now offered seven doctoral programs in public policy, computer science, nursing, and education, in addition to clinical psychology, gerontology, and environmental biology.

Each year of the 1990s saw an increase in the SAT scores of undergraduate applicants, the university gained campus chapters of Alpha Lambda Delta and the Golden Key International Honour Society, the undergraduate Honors Program expanded from 65 students into the Honors College with 400 students in 2013, and the university also had enrolled its first Fulbright scholars. Between 1996 and 2000, the number of undergraduate STEM majors at the school increased by 20 percent, and in computer science alone enrollment increased by two-thirds, and biochemistry, earth and geographic sciences all by one-third. Enrollment steadily increased during Chancellor Penney's tenure to 12,482 total students and 2,866 graduate students by 2000, and the university went from one in twelve students who were minority or female in 1988 to one in three by 2000. The percentage of faculty that was black rose from 13 percent in 1988 to 20 percent in 2000, and the percentage of faculty that was female rose from less than one-third in 1988 to 41 percent in 2000.

On February 19, 1997, President Bill Clinton delivered an address on the campus (arranged in part by U.S. Representative Joe Moakley from Massachusetts's 9th congressional district), and on October 3, 2000, the Clark Athletic Center hosted the first presidential debate between Texas Governor George W. Bush and Vice President Al Gore during the 2000 United States presidential election. After filing objections with the Federal Election Commission, political activist and Green Party nominee Ralph Nader attempted to enter the debate site twice but was blocked by the U.S. Secret Service both times. The cancellation of two days of classes to create security for the debate resulted in a protest by UMass Boston students, faculty, and staff members at UMass System President William Bulger's office in Downtown Boston.

In 2000, Chancellor Penney resigned to accept an endowed chair within the College of Management. Except between 1995 and 1996 while Penney served as the interim UMass System President and the university's Vice Chancellor of Administration and Finance Jean F. MacCormack served in her place, Penney had served as the UMass Boston Chancellor for nearly 12 years. She was succeeded in the interim in 2000 by David MacKenzie, and permanently in May 2001 by Jo Ann M. Gora, the provost of Old Dominion University. During Gora's tenure, the McCormack Institute of Public Affairs became the John W. McCormack Graduate School of Policy and Global Studies in 2003, and the PhD program in green chemistry, the first in the world, was launched under the direction of chemist and UMass Boston alumnus John Warner in 2004. Gora would resign as chancellor in 2004 to become President of Ball State University, and was succeeded in the interim by J. Keith Motley, the university's Vice Chancellor for Student Affairs. During Motley's interim tenure, the university established a partnership with the Dana–Farber/Harvard Cancer Center in 2005.

2004–2015: New campus center and 25-year master plan 

On April 2, 2004, a new Campus Center next to Wheatley Hall was opened. Construction for the facility began on July 20, 2001, and was completed during the tenure of Chancellor Jo Ann M. Gora. It became the new entrance for the campus and was the first building constructed since the Clark Athletic Center was completed in 1979. The building was designed by the Boston-based architectural firm Kallmann McKinnell & Wood and built by the Suffolk Construction Company at a cost of $80 million. Unlike the original Harbor Campus buildings, which were uniformly built of brick and faced inward, the Campus Center was designed such that its glass front would look out onto Boston Harbor, and the offices, food court, event space, student clubs, and activities space gave the campus a center of cohesion that was often lacking in the older buildings.

In 2005, Chancellor Gora was permanently succeeded by Michael F. Collins, the president and CEO of Caritas Christi Health Care. On July 19, 2006, Chancellor Collins ordered the immediate and permanent closure of the parking garage underneath the main campus, causing a loss of 1,500 parking spaces. Two days later, an article in The Boston Globe summarized the deterioration of the facility:

The University of Massachusetts at Boston has closed an underground parking garage that has been decaying for decades. ... Over the years, the garage has become a dreary labyrinth, with walls and floor so eroded from the salty environment that they look like a coral reef. Nets hang from the ceiling to catch fragments of falling cement, a problem linked to the use of low-quality concrete in the construction.

Chunks of concrete had been falling from the garage ceiling since the 1990s, and when Chancellor Collins ordered the closure, 600 spaces had already been lost due to ongoing repairs and rerouting of passenger and vehicular traffic. Because of the salt water atmosphere and the road salt from vehicles, the steel reinforcing bars embedded in the campus substructure concrete walls and ceiling became severely degraded, and because all of the campus mechanical systems had run conduits through the substructure, many of those systems could not be repaired and the damage was causing outages of the computer, electrical, heat, and air-conditioning equipment. An engineering report indicated that to repair the garage such that it would be safe for parking would cost $150 million. On October 2, 2006, the university began the process of creating a master plan to renew the campus. In 2010, a 385-pound section of the garage ceiling below Wheatley Hall fell.

On June 2, 2006, U.S. Senator Barack Obama from Illinois addressed his commencement speech at UMass Boston to the graduating students. Among other topics, he discussed his keynote address to the 2004 Democratic National Convention in Boston. In early 2007, Chancellor Collins resigned to become chancellor of the University of Massachusetts Medical School, and he was succeeded on July 1, 2007 by former interim chancellor J. Keith Motley, who became the university's first African American chancellor. By December 14, 2007, Chancellor Motley presented a 25-year master plan to the UMass System Board of Trustees, who accepted the plan in full. Included in the 25-year master plan was the proposal to erect the university's first residential facilities that would accommodate 2,000 students, but not with the intention of changing the character of the university from a commuter school to a residential school.

Eight months later on August 7, 2008, Massachusetts Governor Deval Patrick signed a higher education bond bill with $100 million directed towards the construction of a new integrated sciences complex at the Morrissey Boulevard entrance of the university's campus, a second $100 million directed towards constructing a general academic building, and the following week, U.S. Senator Ted Kennedy from Massachusetts announced that he would accelerate his plans to construct the Edward M. Kennedy Institute for the United States Senate on Columbia Point next to his brother's presidential library. In 2009, the nearby Bayside Expo Center property was lost in a foreclosure to a Florida-based real estate firm, LNR/CMAT, and on May 19, 2010, the university purchased the property to use as campus facilities and to recoup 1,300 parking spaces. By 2013, with the construction of the EMK Institute underway on April 8, 2011, the construction of the Integrated Sciences Complex underway on June 8, 2011, renovations to the Clark Athletic Center's gymnasium from March to December 2012, construction for a second academic building (General Academic Building No. 1) underway on February 27, 2013, and a utility corridor and roadway network project begun in the spring of 2013, the university's campus became "a multi-site construction zone."

In 2006, a report commissioned by the university on its areas of research strength and areas with opportunities for research, titled "Research Re-envisioned for the 21st Century: A Strategic Opportunity Assessment", was released. In 2007, the College of Nursing and Health Sciences began the GoKids Boston program to counter childhood obesity, and in 2008, the Graduate College of Education renamed itself the College of Education and Human Development. In 2010, the Carnegie Foundation for the Advancement of Teaching upgraded UMass Boston's designation a second time, now to a Doctoral/Research University with High Activity. On September 26, 2011, a Strategic Planning Task Force chaired by university provost Winston E. Langley and convened by Chancellor Motley issued its final report "Fulfilling the Promise: A Blueprint for UMass Boston". In 2012, biology professor Kamaljit S. Bawa won the Gunnerus Sustainability Award.

In 2013, the university established its School for Global Inclusion and Social Development (the first of its kind in the world), its University Honors Program as a separate Honors College, and its School for the Environment and launched an interdisciplinary Nantucket Semester Program (on land donated to the UMass Board of Trustees in 1963 by a Nantucket summer resident that became the university's Nantucket Field Station in the 1970s). In 2014, research activity at the university had climbed to $60 million, and the university began work on its HarborWalk Improvements and Shoreline Stabilization project. By the fall semester of 2014, total student enrollment had grown to 16,756 with 4,056 graduate students. The number of doctoral students had increased from 230 in the fall of 2000 to 614 in the fall of 2014.

2015–present: New buildings 

In 2014, UMass Boston celebrated its fiftieth anniversary, and in 2015, the University of Massachusetts Press published the school's first history about its founding and growth, entitled UMass Boston at 50. In 2015, the College of Management enrolled close to one-sixth of all students and more than half of the undergraduate students earning degrees in a STEM field were minority or female. By 2015, UMass Boston students came from 140 different nations and spoke 90 different languages. On January 26, 2015, the university opened its first new academic building since the Columbia Point campus was built, a research facility named the Integrated Sciences Complex. The building cost $182 million to construct, was designed by the Boston-based architectural firm Goody Clancy, and was constructed by Walsh Brothers.

On March 30, 2015, the dedication ceremony for the Edward M. Kennedy Institute for the United States Senate was held with President and First Lady of the United States Barack and Michelle Obama, Senator Kennedy's wife Victoria Reggie Kennedy, Vice President Joe Biden, U.S. Secretary of State John Kerry, U.S. Senator John McCain from Arizona, former U.S. Senate Majority Leaders Tom Daschle from North Dakota and Trent Lott from Mississippi, U.S. Senators Elizabeth Warren and Ed Markey from Massachusetts, Massachusetts Governor Charlie Baker, former U.S. Representative Patrick J. Kennedy from Rhode Island, Connecticut State Senator Edward M. Kennedy Jr., Boston Mayor Marty Walsh, EMK Institute President and former interim chancellor of UMass Boston Jean F. MacCormack, and many others in attendance. On the following day, the institute opened to the public.

On June 11, 2015, the university broke ground on construction for a new baseball field across University Drive West from the Clark Athletic Center, and was scheduled to be completed by December 1 of that year. The construction was supported by a $2 million gift from the Yawkey Foundation, was built with the exact dimensions of Fenway Park, and was named for Boston College President J. Donald Monan, SJ. On July 17, 2015, the university completed a project begun the previous summer to stabilize an eroded 800-foot segment of the Dorchester Bay shoreline and pave a new walkway along the Boston Harborwalk in between the JFK Presidential Library and the Harbor Point Apartments. The project cost $2.8 million, placed 3,200 tons of stone along the shoreline (including a significant amount of granite unearthed by the Big Dig that was donated by the Massachusetts Department of Transportation), and also constructed new benches, lighting, gathering spaces, and an artwork display area alongside the walkway.

On January 25, 2016, the university began a phased opening of its second new academic facility, University Hall. The building cost $130 million to construct, was designed by the Boston-based Wilson Architects, and was constructed by the Gilbane Building Company. The following month, the university announced that it would construct the first residential facilities in the university's history. In September 2016, U.S. News & World Report ranked UMass Boston within the first tier of national universities on its Best Colleges Ranking for the first time in the university's history, tied at number 220. In December 2016, the university broke ground on the 1,077-bed residential facilities located along University Drive North and West and one set back from Mount Vernon Street. The following month, the university broke ground on a 1,400-space free-standing parking garage adjacent to the Integrated Sciences Complex at the Morrissey Boulevard entrance of the campus. On March 3, 2017, former Bowdoin College president Barry Mills was appointed the university's deputy chancellor and chief operating officer. In this role, he oversaw the academic and research program and campus operations.

On April 5, 2017, university officials announced that Chancellor J. Keith Motley would resign at the end of the academic calendar year on June 30, take a one-year sabbatical, and return as a tenured faculty member. UMass System President Marty Meehan stated Deputy Chancellor Mills would serve as interim chancellor "until [university] finances are stabilized and the university is positioned to attract a world-class chancellor through a global search", specifically to address the university's 2017 operating budget deficit of $30 million. In response to the appointment of Mills and Motley's resignation announcement, UMass Boston faculty publicly expressed concern that Motley was being scapegoated for the university's budget deficit while Boston City Councilors Tito Jackson and Ayanna Pressley and Massachusetts State Representatives Linda Dorcena Forry and Russell Holmes called upon System President Meehan to reject Motley's resignation. On April 8, 2017, at a UMass System Board of Trustees meeting, UMass Boston faculty and students protested decisions by university administration to cut offerings of courses (many required for graduation) in the upcoming summer semester, as well as other programs and to make expense adjustments which reduced the deficit to approximately $6 million or $7 million. On April 24, 2017, Massachusetts Governor Charlie Baker announced that the state government capital budget for fiscal year 2018 would include $78 million towards repairs for fixing the substructure parking garage.

On July 1, 2017, Barry Mills became interim chancellor after Keith Motley's resignation. In September 2017, for the second consecutive year, U.S. News & World Report ranked UMass Boston within the first tier of national universities on its Best Colleges Ranking, and elevated the school in the rankings to a tie at number 202, while a coalition of UMass Boston administrative staff, faculty, and students formed in the same month (called the "Coalition to Save UMB") and issued a report authored by faculty calling on Massachusetts Governor Charlie Baker and the Massachusetts General Court to increase state funding to assist the university to service its debt from its campus renewal construction projects and increase capital investments for the university. In November 2017, an audit commissioned by UMass System President Marty Meehan and conducted by KPMG was presented to the UMass System Board of Trustees that found that faulty record keeping, a lack of discipline in its budgeting process, and a failure on the part of UMass Boston administration to appreciate the cost of the campus renewal construction projects on the university's operating budget led to the university's $30 million budget deficit, and in the same month, the university laid-off 36 employees after laying off about 100 non-tenure track faculty earlier in the year.

In January 2018, the UMass Building Authority put the university's Bayside Expo Center property up for sale. In April 2018, University of Massachusetts Amherst and Mount Ida College administrators announced that the former school would acquire the latter's campus in Newton after the latter college's closure. The acquisition was immediately opposed by UMass Boston faculty and students due to inadequate consultation with the Boston campus faculty, the Boston campus' budget deficit, and that because of the proximity of the Mount Ida campus to the Boston campus, the faculty contended that the new campus would compete with the Boston campus. As of April 2018, the UMass Boston campus remained the sole campus in the UMass system with a majority-minority enrollment. In May 2018, following the approval of the sale by the office of Massachusetts Attorney General Maura Healey, the UMass Boston Faculty Council passed a motion of no confidence in UMass System President Marty Meehan and the UMass System Board of Trustees. In the same month, 10 days after three finalists for the UMass Boston chancellor position were named, on May 21, 2018, all three finalists withdrew from consideration after faculty members questioned the qualifications of the candidates.

On June 20, 2018, UMass System Senior Vice President for Academic Affairs Katherine Newman was appointed as the university's interim chancellor by the UMass System Board of Trustees effective July 1, 2018. In September 2018, U.S. News & World Report ranked UMass Boston within the first tier of national universities on its Best Colleges Ranking for the third consecutive year (and further elevated the school to a tie at number 191), students moved into UMass Boston's first dormitory, and the university opened the free-standing parking garage adjacent to the Integrated Sciences Complex. The residence halls project cost $120 million to construct, was led by Capstone Development Partners, built by Shawmut Construction, and designed by Elkus Manfredi Architects. The garage project cost $69 million to construct, was managed by Skanska, built by the Suffolk Construction Company, and designed by Fennick McCredie Architecture.

In October 2018, Boston Mayor Marty Walsh announced a comprehensive climate change adaptation proposal to protect the Boston Harbor coastline from flooding. In February 2019, university campus employees protested an administration decision to increase the daily parking fee from $6 to $15 to cover the costs of the garage operation and other expenses. In the same month, the UMass System Board of Trustees unanimously approved a 99-year final lease agreement for the Bayside Expo Center with Accordia Partners for $192 million to $235 million. During the 2018–2019 academic year, UMass Boston served 650 military veterans, managed $4 million in federal G.I. benefits, and was ranked by multiple publications as being among the best universities in the United States for veteran students.

In May 2019, the Pioneer Institute released a white paper co-authored by former Massachusetts State Representative Gregory W. Sullivan (who also served as the Massachusetts Inspector General) that reviewed records obtained from the UMass System Controller's Office (as well as other publicly available documents) that concluded that Chancellor Keith Motley and other UMass Boston administrators were scapegoated for the 2017 fiscal year $30 million budget deficit and that instead the approval by the System Board of Trustees of an accelerated 5-year capital spending plan in December 2014 without assuring that capital reserves would be made available to pay for the plan, as well as an error to a 5-year campus reserve ratio estimate prepared by the UMass Central Budget Office and presented to the System Board of Trustees in April 2016, was the cause of the $26 million in budget reductions implemented by interim Chancellor Barry Mills and that the reductions were made at the direction of the UMass Central Office.

Additionally, the white paper states that KPMG's 2017 audit was not conducted in accordance with Generally Accepted Government Auditing Standards or reported in accordance with auditing standards prescribed by the American Institute of Certified Public Accountants, and that the purchase of Mount Ida College in April 2018 was conducted by a wire transfer from the UMass System for $75 million without being included on the previously approved university capital plan at the time the UMass Central Office ordered the budget reductions rather than UMass Amherst purchasing the Mount Ida campus with loanable funds to be repaid with interest (and in contrast to how the transaction was described in a press statement issued by Meehan's office). The following month, interim Chancellor Katherine Newman issued a press statement disputing the findings of the white paper.

In September 2019, the UMass Boston Faculty Staff Union President addressed the UMass System Board of Trustees to protest the potential offering of equivalent programs at the Mount Ida campus that are already offered at the Boston campus. The following December, the UMass Boston Faculty Staff Union President presented the board with a petition from the Boston campus faculty reiterating their concerns about the Mount Ida campus and requesting more input into its planning. Also in 2019, the $164 million project to develop a new utility corridor and roadway network led by BVH Integrated Services, Inc. and built by Bond Brothers was completed. In January 2020, a $45 million project managed by Hill International, designed by CannonDesign, and built by Consigli Construction to renovate Wheatley and McCormack Halls, the Quinn Administration Building, and the Healey Library to relocate programs from the original Science Center (to facilitate its demolition) was completed.

In February 2020, University of California, Los Angeles Dean Marcelo Suárez-Orozco was unanimously appointed as the new permanent chancellor of the university succeeding Katharine Newman, and Suárez-Orozco assumed the position on August 1, 2020. In October 2020, the Walsh administration released a 174-page climate change adaptation report for the Boston Harbor coastline in Dorchester with a section on Columbia Point and Morrissey Boulevard. In September 2021, the UMass System Board of Trustees Chair announced that a $15 million endowment would be established for the UMass Boston College of Nursing and Health Sciences as part of a $50 million personal donation to the UMass System (the largest in its history) by the System Board of Trustees Chair and his wife. In February 2023, Chancellor Suárez-Orozco stated that the repairs to the substructure parking garage were complete in an interview with the Dorchester Reporter.

Timeline 
(from UMass Boston website, note that this also contains the history of Boston State College)
1851 – Boston School Superintendent Nathan Bishop proposes a normal school to train teachers for the elementary grades.
1852 – Girls' High School conducts its first classes in the Adams School building on Mason St.
1854 – Girls' High is renamed Girls' High and Normal School.
1863 – Massachusetts Agricultural College (M.A.C) is founded in Amherst.
1870 – The school moves to new quarters on West Newton St.
1872 – Boston Normal School becomes a separate institution.
1876 – Boston Normal moves to the Rice School building on Dartmouth St.
1907 – Boston Normal moves to a specially built facility on Huntington Ave.
1922 – Boston Normal becomes the Teachers College of the City of Boston.
1931 - "M.A.C." became Massachusetts State College.
1947 - "M.A.C." became University of Massachusetts.
1952 – Teachers College becomes the State Teachers College at Boston.
1960 – Renamed State College at Boston at 100 Arlington St. in Park Square.
1964 – The University of Massachusetts Boston is established.
1968 – State College at Boston renamed Boston State College.
1974 – First classes at UMass Boston's Harbor Campus.
1982 – Boston State College merges with UMass Boston.
2004 – New UMass Boston Campus Center opens.
2015 – New Integrated Sciences Complex opens.
2016 – New University Hall Building opens.
2018 - First University Residence Hall opens.

Campus 

UMass Boston is located off Interstate 93 and within one mile of the JFK/UMass MBTA Station on the Red Line and the Old Colony Lines of the Commuter Rail. , the UMass Boston shuttle service is unavailable and the MBTA Bus Routes 8 and 16 have been rerouted to make stops at the university's Residence Hall.

Columbia Point buildings

 Calf Pasture Pumping Station – Originally built and designed by Boston Architect George Albert Clough in 1883, the sewage treatment plant is currently being evaluated by UMass Building Authority for redevelopment.
 Healey Library – Original Columbia Point campus building opened in 1974. Named for Joseph P. Healey, UMass System Board of Trustees Chair (1969–1981).
 McCormack Hall – Original Columbia Point campus building opened in 1974. Named for John W. McCormack, Speaker of the U.S. House of Representatives (1962–1971).
 Quinn Administration Building – Original Columbia Point campus building opened in 1974. Named for Robert H. Quinn, Speaker of the Massachusetts House of Representatives (1967–1969) and UMass System Board of Trustees Chair (1981–1986).
 Science Center – Original Columbia Point campus building opened in 1974. Demolished in 2020.
 Wheatley Hall – Original Columbia Point campus building opened in 1974. Named for Revolutionary War-era and first-published African-American female poet Phillis Wheatley.
 Clark Athletic Center – Broke ground in 1978 and completed in 1979. On October 3, 2000, hosted the first debate between Texas Governor George W. Bush and Vice President Al Gore during the 2000 U.S. presidential election.
 Campus Center – Broke ground in 2001 and completed in 2004. The building cost $80 million to construct, was designed by the Boston-based architectural firm Kallmann McKinnell & Wood, and built by the Suffolk Construction Company.
 Integrated Sciences Complex – Broke ground in 2011 and completed in 2015. The building cost $182 million to construct, was designed by the Boston-based architectural firm Goody Clancy, and was constructed by Walsh Brothers.
 Monan Park – Broke ground and completed in 2015. The construction was supported by a $2 million gift from the Yawkey Foundation, was built with the exact dimensions of Fenway Park, and was named for Boston College President J. Donald Monan, SJ. Jointly owned with Boston College High School.
 University Hall – Broke ground in 2013 and opened in 2016. The building cost $130 million to construct, was designed by the Boston-based Wilson Architects, and was constructed by the Gilbane Building Company.
 Residence Hall East and West – Broke ground in 2016 and opened in 2018. The residence halls project cost $120 million to construct, was led by Capstone Development Partners, built by Shawmut Construction, and designed by Elkus Manfredi Architects.
 Parking Garage West – Broke ground in 2017 and opened in 2018. The garage project cost $69 million to construct, was managed by Skanska, built by the Suffolk Construction Company, and designed by Fennick McCredie Architecture.

Off-site locations 
UMass Boston's Institute for New England Native American Studies and Institute for Community Inclusion (UMass Boston's joint program with Boston Children's Hospital that is part of the national Association of University Centers on Disabilities) have their main offices on the fourth floor of the Bayside Office Center at 150 Mount Vernon Street, which is adjacent to the former Bayside Expo Center and down the street from the main campus. UMass Boston's Early Learning Center that is accredited by the National Association for the Education of Young Children is located at 2 Harbor Point Boulevard in the Harbor Point Apartments complex adjacent to the campus. UMass Boston's Biology Department and School for the Environment also have a field station on Nantucket.

Future campus development 
On December 7, 2009, a 25-Year Master Plan was published, outlining future campus development and construction projects, which included the construction of the Integrated Sciences Complex and University Hall, as well as the improvements to the Boston HarborWalk. Projects include:
A $137 million project managed by Hill International and designed by NBBJ to demolish the original Science Center, the university swimming pool building, the majority of the campus substructure and plaza adjoining those facilities, and to construct a campus quadrangle and 300-space parking lot in their place, which began in July 2020, and is expected to be completed by the 2022–2023 winter;
A second general-purpose academic building (General Academic Building No. 2), which received $100 million in state funding in 2012 and that is to be built next to Wheatley Hall in between University Drives South and East and the Campus Center bus stop;
A project to restore the Calf Pasture Pumping Station Complex and to construct a mixed-use facility on an adjacent 10-acre site for which the UMass Building Authority issued a request for information in January 2020, received eight proposals in response by the following September, and issued a request for proposal in July 2021.

Academics 

UMass Boston has a graduation rate of 49% and an annual retention rate of 76%. The university confers bachelor's, master's, and doctoral degrees, and also operates certificate programs and a corporate, continuing, and distance learning program.

There are eleven schools and colleges at UMass Boston: the College of Liberal Arts, College of Science and Mathematics, School for the Environment, College of Management, College of Nursing and Health Sciences, College of Public and Community Service, College of Education and Human Development, John W. McCormack Graduate School of Policy Studies and Global Studies, School for Global Inclusion and Social Development, Honors College, and College of Advancing and Professional Studies (CAPS).

The university is a member of the Urban 13 universities, alongside schools like Temple University and the University of Pittsburgh. The university maintains a partnership with the University of International Relations, a university with ties to the Ministry of State Security of the People's Republic of China.

In the 2017–2018 academic year, the five most popular majors at the university were Management, Biology, Psychology, Exercise and Health Sciences, and Nursing. Within the College of Liberal Arts, the five most popular majors were Psychology, Criminal Justice, Economics, Communication Studies, and English. Within the College of Science and Mathematics, the five most popular majors were Biology, Computer Science, Biochemistry, Mathematics, and Electrical Engineering. Within the College of Management, the five most popular concentrations were Accounting, Finance, Marketing, Information Technology, and International Management. The five most popular minors at the university were Psychology, Sociology, Economics, Criminal Justice, and English (tied with Biology).

Accreditation 
UMass Boston is accredited by the New England Commission of Higher Education. Additionally, the College of Management is accredited by the Association to Advance Collegiate Schools of Business (AACSB), and the College of Nursing and Health Services hold accreditation from the National League for Nursing Accreditation Commission and the Commonwealth of Massachusetts Board of Registration in Nursing. The Family Therapy Program is accredited by the Commission on Accreditation of Marital and Family Therapy Education (COAMFTE). UMass Boston is a member of the Council of Graduate Schools and the Northeastern Association of Graduate Schools.  UMass Boston is part of the Greater Boston Urban Education Collaborative.

Faculty 

UMass Boston's faculty of 1,243 consists of 182 tenure-track and 210 non-tenure-track professors. 96 percent of the faculty hold the highest degree in their fields and the student-teacher ratio is 16:1. It includes poet Lloyd Schwartz (who was awarded the Pulitzer Prize for Criticism in 1994 and co-edited the Library of America's Elizabeth Bishop: Poems, Prose, and Letters in 2008), and Jill McDonough, translator and Slavic philologist Diana Lewis Burgin, linguist Donaldo Macedo, author Padraig O'Malley, feminist scholar Carol Cohn, economists Julie A. Nelson and Randy Albelda, philosophers Lynne Tirrell and Lawrence Blum, political scientists Leila Farsakh and Thomas Ferguson, psychologist Sharon Lamb, Monet expert Paul Hayes Tucker, biologist Kamaljit S. Bawa, and physicist Benjamin Mollow, discoverer of the Mollow triplet.

Former faculty members include biblical scholar Richard A. Horsley, chemist John Warner, evolutionary biologist Joan Roughgarden, feminist writers Beverly Smith and Christina Hoff Sommers, politician Mary B. Newman (namesake of the Mary B. Newman Award for Academic Excellence), historians Edward Berkowitz, James Green, Peter Linebaugh, William Andrew Moffett, Mark Peattie, and James Turner, literary scholar Carlo L. Golino (who served as the university's chancellor from 1973 to 1978), mathematicians Amir Aczel, Victor S. Miller, and Robert Thomas Seeley, computer scientist Patrick O'Neil, neurologist M. V. Padma Srivastava, novelists Jaime Clarke, Elizabeth Searle, and Melanie Rae Thon, philosopher Jane Roland Martin, poets Martha Collins and Sabra Loomis, political scientists Jalal Alamgir and Kent John Chabotar, clinical psychologist David Lisak, social psychologist Melanie Joy, and sociologists Benjamin Bolger and Robert Dentler.

Institutes and centers 

The following free-standing institutes and centers are administered by the Office of the Provost and Vice Chancellor for Academic Affairs.
Center for Social Development and Education
Center for Survey Research
Institute for Asian American Studies (a member of the Asian American and Pacific Islander Policy Research Consortium)
Institute for Community Inclusion
Massachusetts Office of Public Collaboration
The Mauricio Gastón Institute for Latino Community Development and Public Policy
Urban Harbors Institute
Venture Development Center
William Joiner Institute for the Study of War and Social Consequences
William Monroe Trotter Institute for the Study of Black Culture

The following university-wide institutes and centers are operationally managed by collective leadership teams appointed by the Provost and Vice Chancellor for Academic Affairs.
Center of Science and Mathematics in Context
Center for Personalized Cancer Therapy (a collaborative venture with the Dana–Farber/Harvard Cancer Center)
Confucius Institute
Developmental Sciences Research Center
Institute for Early Education Leadership and Innovation
Institute for International and Comparative Education
Sustainable Solutions Lab

The following institutes and centers are administered by their college or department.

Adult Literacy Resource Institute
Andrew Fiske Memorial Center for Archaeological Research
Broadening Advanced Technological Education Connections
Center for Coastal Environmental Sensing Networks
Center for Collaborative Leadership
Center for Environmental Health, Science, and Technology
Center for Governance and Sustainability
Center for Green Chemistry
Center for Innovation and Excellence in eLearning
Center for Innovative Teaching
Center for Peace, Democracy, and Development
Center for Portuguese Language – Instituto Camoes
Center for Rebuilding Sustainable Communities after Disasters
Center for Social and Demographic Research on Aging
Center for Social Policy
Center for Sustainable Enterprise and Regional Competitiveness
Center for the Study of Gender, Security, and Human Rights

Center for the Study of the Humanities, Culture and Society
Center for Women in Politics and Public Policy
Center for World Languages and Cultures
Center on Media and Society
China Program Center
Edward J. Collins, Jr. Center for Public Management
Entrepreneurship Center
Gerontology Institute
GoKids Boston Youth Fitness and Training Center
Institute for Learning and Teaching
Institute for New England Native American Studies
Labor Resource Center
New England Resource Center for Higher Education
Osher Lifelong Learning Institute
Pension Action Center
The Massachusetts Small Business Development Center & Minority Business Center

Athletics 
Intercollegiate athletics, intramurals, and recreation for the students, staff, and faculty are the primary programs of the UMass Boston Department of Athletics. The department offers 18 varsity sports and is a member of the NCAA's Division III. UMass Boston, known by their nickname: the Beacons, has teams competing in the ECAC, the Little East Conference, and ECAC East Ice Hockey. The Beacons have been named All-Americans 93 times in seven sports.  The women's indoor and outdoor track & field teams have won four NCAA team championships and 38 NCAA individual championships.  In the years 1999 through 2006 the National Consortium for Academics and Sports named the Department of Athletics at UMass Boston first in the country for community service.

Student activities 

UMass Boston's independent, student run and financed newspaper is The Mass Media. Other student publications include the yearbook, Watermark arts and literary magazine, and The Beacon monthly humor magazine. UMass Boston also owns and operates WUMB-FM (91.9), a 24-hour, public, noncommercial radio station that broadcasts folk music programs and produces the award-winning public and cultural affairs program, Commonwealth Journal.

UMass Boston's undergraduates are represented by the Undergraduate Student Government, which consists of the Undergraduate Student Senate, the executive office of the USG President, and the office of the USG Chief Justice. UMass Boston's graduate students are represented by the Graduate Student Assembly. UMass Boston's graduate student employees (teaching assistants, research assistants, and administrative assistants) are represented by the Graduate Employee Organization/UAW Local 1596—UMass Boston Chapter.

The university also has a large waterfront recreation program. The Division of Marine Operations operates the university's waterfront which supports recreational and environmental education programs. Full-time Umass Boston students are offered free sailing lessons and boat rentals, paddleboards, kayaks and harbor cruises. Marine Operations recently developed the U-Sea Fund Grant for UMass Boston Faculty who are interested in developing a classroom component around our ocean environment. Starting summer 2011 Marine Operations will work in conjunction with B&G, Boating in Boston, to offer a sailing camp for youth up to age 18. Boating in Boston has operated for years in other locations and have shown considerable interest in UMass Boston's grand waterfront.

National student societies or professional organizations with active local or student chapters at UMass Boston include Alpha Lambda Delta, the American Society for Biochemistry and Molecular Biology, College Democrats of America, Delta Sigma Pi, Free the Children, the Golden Key International Honour Society, the National Student Nurses' Association, Phi Delta Epsilon, the Public Interest Research Group, the Society for the Advancement of Chicanos/Hispanics and Native Americans in Science, the Society of Physics Students, and Young Americans for Liberty. The American Chemical Society had a student chapter at UMass Boston, but as of the Fall 2016 semester it is inactive.

Notable alumni 

Joseph Abboud, B.A. 1972, International Men's Fashion Designer.
Amsale Aberra, B.A. 1981, Celebrity Wedding designer.
Cory Atkins, (B.S. 1979), Member of the Massachusetts House of Representatives (1999–2019).
Panayiota Bertzikis, B.A. 2010, Humanitarian.
Daniel E. Bosley, (M.S. 1996), Member of the Massachusetts House of Representatives (1987–2011).
 Edward Scott Bozek (1950–2022), Olympic épée fencer
William Bratton, B.A. 1975, Boston City Police Commissioner (1993–1994), New York City Police Commissioner (1994–1996; 2014–2016), Los Angeles Police Department Chief (2002–2009), Member of the Homeland Security Advisory Council (2011–Present).
Phillip Brutus, B.S. 1982, Member of the Florida House of Representatives (2001–2007).
Christine Canavan, (B.S. Nursing (summa cum laude) 1988), Member of the Massachusetts House of Representatives (1993–2015).
Ken Casey, bassist for the punk rock group the Dropkick Murphys.
Lenny Clarke, (did not finish), comedian/actor.
Tim Costello (1945–2009), labor and anti-globalization advocate and author.
Paul Donato, Mayor of Medford, Massachusetts (1980–1985), Member of Massachusetts House of Representatives (2001–Present), Second Assistant Majority Whip of the Massachusetts House of Representatives (2009–Present).
Paul M. English, B.A. 1987 and M.S. 1989 (both in Computer Science), co-founder and CTO of Kayak.com.
Jennifer L. Flanagan, (B.S. Political Science, 1998), Member of the Massachusetts House of Representatives (2005–2009), Member of the Massachusetts Senate (2009–2017).
Jovita Fontanez 1984, head of Boston Election Commission, member of Massachusetts Electoral College.
Beth Harrington, filmmaker and musician
Robert L. Hedlund, Member of the Massachusetts Senate (1991–1993; 1995–2016), Mayor of Weymouth, Massachusetts (2016–Present).
Patricia D. Jehlen, (M.A. History), Member of the Massachusetts House of Representatives (1991–2005), Member of the Massachusetts Senate (2005–Present).
John F. Kelly, B.A. 1976, general in the United States Marine Corps, commander of U.S. Southern Command (USSOUTHCOM) from 2012 to 2016. Former senior military assistant to the Secretary of Defense, former commander of Multi-National Force-West, Iraq, U.S. Secretary of Homeland Security (January–July 2017), White House Chief of Staff (July 2017–January 2019).
Joseph P. Kennedy II, (B.A. 1976), current president of Citizens Energy Corporation and former member of the U.S. House of Representatives (1987–1999).
Dennis Lehane, (did not finish), author.
Ron Mariano, (M.Ed., 1972), Speaker of the Massachusetts House of Representatives (2020–Present), Member of the Massachusetts House of Representatives (1991–Present), Majority Leader of the Massachusetts House of Representatives (2011–2020).
Juana Matias, state representative
Gina McCarthy, (B.A., 1976), Administrator of the U.S. Environmental Protection Agency (2013–2017), White House National Climate Advisor (2021–2022) 
Michael J. McGlynn, (B.A. Political Science/History, 1976). Member of the Massachusetts House of Representatives (1977–1988), Mayor of Medford, Massachusetts (1988–2016).
Thomas Menino, (B.A. Community Planning, 1988). Mayor of Boston (1993–2014), Boston City Council President (1993), Member of the Boston City Council (1984–1993).
Janet Mills B.A. 1970, Maine Attorney General (2009–2011; 2013–2019), 75th Governor of Maine (2019–).
Michael J. Moran, (B.A. Economics, 1995), Member of the Massachusetts House of Representatives (2005–Present).
Eileen Myles, B.A. Author.
Kelly Overton, Activist.
Joe Rogan, (did not finish), comedian, actor, "NewsRadio" and "Fear Factor".
Jeffrey Sánchez, (B.A. Legal Education), Member of the Massachusetts House of Representatives (2003–2019).
Debra Saunders, B.A. 1982, conservative columnist, White House Correspondent of the Las Vegas Review-Journal.
Biz Stone, (did not finish) Co-Founder of Twitter.
Steve Sweeney, B.A. 1974, Comedian.
John M. Tobin, Jr., (B.A. Political Science), Member of the Boston City Council (2002–2010).
Harry Trask, B.A. 1969, (1928–2002) 1957 Pulitzer Prize in Photography (for a photograph of the SS Andrea Doria sinking).
Robert Travaglini, B.S. 1974. President of the Massachusetts Senate (2003–2007), Member of the Massachusetts Senate (1992–2007), Member of the Boston City Council (1984–1992).
 Samuel Urkato, Minister of Science and Higher Education, Ethiopia.
Bill Walczak, B.A. 1978. former CEO Codman Square Health Center and candidate for Mayor of Boston.
John Warner, B.S. 1984, one of the founding fathers of Green Chemistry; founded first PhD program in Green Chemistry.
 Georgette Watson, B.A., anti-drug activist
Dana White, (did not finish), current president of the Ultimate Fighting Championship (UFC).

Notes

References

Footnotes

Bibliography

External links 

UMass Boston Athletics website

 
Boston
University of Massachusetts Boston
Universities and colleges in Boston
Business schools in Massachusetts
Educational institutions established in 1964
Columbia Point, Boston
1964 establishments in Massachusetts
Brutalist architecture in Massachusetts
New England Hockey Conference teams